The  Salt Belt is the U.S. region in which road salt is used in  winter  to control snow and ice. States in the salt belt include Alaska, Connecticut, Delaware, Illinois, Indiana, Iowa, Kansas, Kentucky, Maine, Maryland, Massachusetts, Michigan, Minnesota, Missouri, Nebraska, New Hampshire, New Jersey, New York, North Dakota, Ohio, Pennsylvania, Rhode Island, South Dakota, Vermont, Virginia, West Virginia, Wisconsin, and Washington DC. Other states such as Montana, Wyoming, Colorado, Idaho and Utah are also considered part of the Salt Belt but use less corrosive substances.

Road salt is a common cause for corrosion of automobile parts, and cars in the salt belt often experience more rapid rusting compared to other regions of the country, rendering them unsafe as brake lines, electrical wiring, and structural components are adversely affected.  Manufacturer recalls for corrosion issues often target only vehicles operated within Salt Belt states.

See also 
 Banana Belt

References

External links
NHTSA Defect Investigations Results

Belt regions of the United States
Ice in transportation
Economy of the Northeastern United States
Economy of the Midwestern United States